Jenje is a small town in western Liberia near the country's border with Sierra Leone.

Minerals 

It has an iron ore mine which is connected by a 1067mm gauge railway to the port and capital city of Monrovia.

See also 

 Transport in Liberia

References 

 Travellinglick Map

Populated places in Liberia
Grand Cape Mount County